The 2006 World Wrestling Championships were held at the Tianhe Gymnasium in Guangzhou, China. The event took place from September 25 to October 1, 2006.

Medal table

Team ranking

Medal summary

Men's freestyle

Men's Greco-Roman

Women's freestyle

Participating nations
596 competitors from 75 nations participated.

 (1)
 (12)
 (6)
 (2)
 (9)
 (21)
 (2)
 (11)
 (2)
 (15)
 (1)
 (21)
 (7)
 (7)
 (2)
 (10)
 (5)
 (3)
 (2)
 (7)
 (4)
 (1)
 (7)
 (9)
 (14)
 (16)
 (2)
 (14)
 (1)
 (2)
 (14)
 (17)
 (14)
 (1)
 (5)
 (8)
 (3)
 (21)
 (19)
 (10)
 (2)
 (6)
 (3)
 (3)
 (2)
 (4)
 (14)
 (3)
 (2)
 (2)
 (7)
 (5)
 (2)
 (9)
 (12)
 (1)
 (11)
 (20)
 (2)
 (4)
 (2)
 (3)
 (21)
 (16)
 (9)
 (5)
 (3)
 (15)
 (1)
 (21)
 (2)
 (21)
 (13)
 (9)
 (13)

References
Schedule
Themat.com

External links
Official website

 
FILA Wrestling World Championships
Wrestling World Championships
World Wrestling Championships
Wrestling World Championships